The 81st Pioneers were an infantry regiment of the British Indian Army. They could trace their origins to 1786, when they were raised as the 28th Madras Battalion.

The regiment was first called into action for the campaigns in the Third Anglo-Mysore War. They then took part in the Battle of Seringapatam in the Fourth Anglo-Mysore War. Next they were involved in the Third Anglo-Maratha War, where they fought at the Battle of Nagpore in 1817. In 1879 they were involved in their first  campaigns outside of India, when they took part in the  Second Afghan War. This was followed in 1885 by the Third Burmese War. They returned to India and took  part in the Tirah Campaign in 1897, attached to the Second Division, they did not see any serious fighting until late in the campaign, when they served as the divisional rearguard during a withdrawal 28 December 1897. During World War I they took part in the Mesopotamia Campaign. They also raised a second battalion during the war which was only disbanded in 1921.

 
After World War I the Indian government reformed the army moving from single battalion regiments to multi battalion regiments. In 1922, the 81st Pioneers became the 10th (Training) Battalion, 1st Madras Pioneers. This regiment was disbanded in 1933.

Predecessor names
28th Madras Battalion - 1786
1st Battalion, 11th Madras Native Infantry - 1796
21st Madras Native Infantry - 1824
21st Madras Infantry (Pioneers) - 1885
21st Madras Pioneers - 1901
81st Pioneers - 1903

References

Moberly, F.J. (1923). Official History of the War: Mesopotamia Campaign, Imperial War Museum. 

British Indian Army infantry regiments
Military history of the Madras Presidency
Military units and formations established in 1786
Military units and formations disestablished in 1922